Walter Read was an English cricketer.

Walter Read may also refer to:

Walter Newton Read (1918–2001), Chairman of the New Jersey Casino Control Commission

See also
Walter Reed (disambiguation)
Walter Reade (disambiguation)
Walter Reid (disambiguation)